Global Underground 030: Paris is a DJ mix album in the Global Underground series, compiled and mixed by DJ and producer Nick Warren, which was inspired by his performance at the Mix Club in Paris, on 14 October 2006.  The album is Warren's seventh release in the Global Underground series.

The first disc is atmospheric and melodic, whereas the second is primarily modern dance music.

The album reached #20 on the Billboard Top Electronic Albums.

Background

Warren's latest GU mix finds him taking prog to territories where it's very much on the fringe of the club scene. "Paris is just a stylish city. It's beautiful. known as clubland capital,”. “Paris is the same really.

Track listing

Disc One
Space Gypsie - "After" (5:26)
Tripswitch - "Strange Parallels" (8:19)
Audioglider - "Zusammenallien" (5:26)
Nove - "Sedatives" (4:38)
Audioglider - "Whiskers" (7:21)
Joey Fehrenbach - "Being Around You" (7:21)
Revtone - "Love Movement (Ulrich Schnauss Remix)" (4:33)
Tripswitch - "Roll Your Own" (5:45)
Cates & dpL  - "Living in a" (3:31)
Aurtas - "Lonely Planet" (5:16)
Joey Fehrenbach - "Behold" (3:14)

Disc Two
August - "I Miss" (3:51)
Blue Foundation - "Sweep (Mikkel Metal Vox Reshape)" (6:22)
Zur-Face - "Cosmopolitan Drink" (3:33)
Essenvee - "Head Down" (6:20)
Pole Folder - "Buenos Aires/Bokoto 10PM" (5:03)
16 Bit Lolitas - "Neptune" (6:34)
16 Bit Lolitas - "Non Verbal Language" (6:02)
Habersham and Kazell Presents: Paradise Rockers - "One Thing" (5:01)
Oliver Moldan & Isma Ae - "Five Five Zero" (6:45)
Miika Kuisma - "One Morning by the Riverside" (4:59)
Ohmna - "I'm Lost" (3:44)
Eelke Kleijn - "8 Bit Era" (5:44)
Tannen - "Blackout" (8:17)

References

External links 
Official Release Information from Global Underground News Page

Global Underground
2007 compilation albums